Open range, in Western United States, is the publicly accessible grazeland.

Open range may also refer to: 
Rangeland, vast natural landscapes
 Publicly owned rangeland, in the United States
Open Range Communications, a Colorado-based (now bankrupt) telecommunications business
Open-range zoo
Open Range (1927 film), a lost silent film from Paramount Pictures.
Open Range (2003 film), a Western film co-starring, co-produced, and directed by Kevin Costner

See also
Free range (disambiguation)